Bodey is a surname. People with that name include:

 David Bodey (born 1947), British judge
 George Bodey (died 1930), Australian politician
 John Bodey (1549-1583), English Roman Catholic academic jurist and lay theologian
 W. S. Bodey, (1814-1859), American prospector who discovered gold in Eastern California

See also